Ontario is the most populous province in Canada with 14,223,942 residents as of 2021 and is third-largest in land area at . These municipalities provide local or regional municipal government services within either a single-tier or shared two-tier municipal structure.

A municipality in Ontario is "a geographic area whose inhabitants are incorporated" according to the Municipal Act, 2001. Ontario's three municipality types include upper and lower-tier municipalities within the two-tier structure, and single-tier municipalities (unitary authorities) that are exempt from the two-tier structure. Single and lower-tier municipalities are grouped together as local municipalities. Of Ontario's 444 municipalities, 30 of them are upper-tier municipalities and 414 are local municipalities—241 lower-tier municipalities and 173 single-tier municipalities.

The Municipal Act, 2001 is the legislation that enables incorporation and stipulates governance of Ontario's municipalities, excluding the City of Toronto, which is subject to the City of Toronto Act, 2006. The Municipal Act, 2001 provides lower and single-tier municipalities with the authority to incorporate as cities, towns, villages, townships, or generically as municipalities. There are no minimum population thresholds or other requirements for these municipal sub-types. A municipality can change its status to any of these so long as its resulting name is not being used by another municipality. For upper-tier municipalities, the act provides them with the authority to incorporate as counties, regions and district municipalities.

The City of Ottawa, Canada's capital city, is the province's second-most populous municipality with 1,017,449 residents. The first community to incorporate as a municipality in Ontario was Brockville in 1832.

Upper-tier municipalities 

Ontario's Municipal Act, 2001 defines upper-municipality as "a municipality of which two or more lower-tier municipalities form part for municipal purposes". These upper-tier municipalities include 19 counties, 3 united counties and 8 regional municipalities or regions, all of which represent 30 of Ontario's 49 census divisions. Regional governments are responsible for arterial roads, health services, policing, region-wide land use planning and development, sewer and water systems, social services, transit, and waste disposal, whereas county governments have the lesser responsibilities of arterial roads, county land use planning, health services, and social services.

Local municipalities 

Ontario's Municipal Act, 2001 defines local municipality as "a single-tier municipality or a lower-tier municipality". Combined, Ontario has 414 local municipalities comprising 173 single-tier municipalities and 241 lower-tier municipalities.

Single-tier municipalities 
Ontario's Municipal Act, 2001 defines a single-tier municipality as "a municipality, other than an upper-tier municipality, that does not form part of an upper-tier municipality for municipal purposes". In southern Ontario, single-tier municipalities are either politically separate from but geographically within neighbouring counties or were formed through the amalgamation of upper-tier and lower-tier municipalities. All municipalities in northern Ontario are single-tier municipalities as upper-tier municipalities are not present. Single-tier municipalities provide for all local government services. Ontario has 173 single-tier municipalities comprising 32 cities, 23 municipalities, 28 towns, 85 townships, and 5 villages.

Lower-tier municipalities 
Ontario's Municipal Act, 2001 defines a lower-tier municipality as "a municipality that forms part of an upper-tier municipality for municipal purposes". Ontario has 241 lower-tier municipalities comprising 19 cities, 41 municipalities, 61 towns, 114 townships and 6 villages. Within regions, they are responsible for providing certain local services that are not provided by the regional municipality. Within counties, they are responsible for providing a wider range of local services since counties as upper-tier municipalities provide fewer local services than regions.

List of local municipalities

See also 

Former municipalities in Ontario
List of census agglomerations in Ontario
List of census divisions of Ontario
List of cities in Ontario
List of designated places in Ontario
List of population centres in Ontario
List of towns in Ontario
List of township municipalities in Ontario
List of villages in Ontario

Notes

References

External links 
Ministry of Municipal Affairs and Housing
Municipal Restructuring Activity Summary Table

Municipalities